Starship Patrol (also called Starship Defense in North America and Star Ship Defender in Japan) is a strategy video game of the tower defence type developed by the Japanese company Q Games and released by Nintendo for the DSiWare/Nintendo DSi platform.

Gameplay
Similar to other games of the tower-defence genre, the player must defend a fleet of starships against alien attackers by strategically placing turrets and other defensive mechanisms. The player may make use of certain power-ups and bonuses, but is also rewarded for not using them. The game has 30 stages (or levels) of increasing difficulties, each featuring different structures to be defended. As with other games developed by Q Games for the DSi platform, the game has minimal styling, with the graphics being styled to appear like mathematical graph-paper. 

The games differs from others in the tower defence genre in that the avenue of attack of the enemies varies significantly during the game, though the player is warned about the direction each attack will come from by dotted lines appearing on-screen. The player is allowed to adjust the aiming-zones of their weaponry during attacks to adapt to them.

Reception
Reviewing the game for Nintendo Life, Marcel van Duyn game the game a positive score of 8/10. Van Duyn praised especially the art-style and called it "a game you should definitely consider picking up if you have the slightest bit of interest in the tower defence genre", though they criticised the music saying that it was "a bit low-key and won't really impress". Simon Parkin reviewing the game for the Eurogamer website also reviewed the game positively, describing it as "contemporary and stylish despite its obvious thriftiness" though also "a fairly orthodox Tower Defence game". Edge magazine also reviewed the game positively, stating that it was "as good as you'll find on DSiWare at the moment". Reviewing the North American version of the game for IGN, Daemon Hatfield described it as "the best tower defense game on DSiWare".

The game was subsequently included in the 2010 book 1001 Video Games You Must Play Before You Die which described the graphics as "achingly lo-fi" and the game as a whole as a "rare work of craft".

References

2009 video games
DSiWare games
Nintendo games
Q-Games games
Single-player video games
Strategy video games
Video games developed in Japan